The 2020–21 VTB United League was the 12th season of the VTB United League. It was the eight season that the league functions as the Russian domestic first tier level.

Teams
A total of 13 teams from five countries contested the league, including nine sides from Russia, one from Belarus, one from Estonia, one from Kazakhstan, and one from Poland.

Venues and locations

Regular season
In the regular season, teams play against each other twice (home-and-away) in a round-robin format.

Standings

Results

Playoffs
Quarterfinals were played in a best-of-three format (1-1-1). Semifinals and finals were played in a best-of-five format (2-2-1).

Bracket

Quarterfinals

|}

Semifinals

|}

Finals

|}

VTB League teams in European competitions

Awards

Season awards

MVP of the Month

References

External links 

 Official website

 
2020–21
2020–21 in European basketball leagues
2020–21 in Russian basketball
2020–21 in Estonian basketball
2020–21 in Belarusian basketball
2020–21 in Kazakhstani basketball
2020–21 in Polish basketball